Kholifa Rowalla Chiefdom is a chiefdom in Tonkolili District of Sierra Leone. Its capital is Magburaka. Sierra Leone is divided into 3 provinces and the Western Area with a total of 149 chiefdoms and 12 districts.

References 

Chiefdoms of Sierra Leone
Northern Province, Sierra Leone